Lycée Français Prins Henrik ( is a French international school in central Copenhagen, Denmark. Located in Frederiksberg Allé in the municipality of Frederiksberg, it serves levels primaire (primary school) through lycée (senior high school).

History
A small school known as the "Little Embassy School" opened in association with the French Embassy on Dag Hammerskjölds allé in 1954. A committee of French and Danish parents was established in 1963 and the school moved to larger premises on Blegdamsvej and became a self-owning institution in 1967. In 1969, the school had 110 students and introduced a sixth grade for the first time.

In 1973 the school moved to a new building on Frederiksberg Allé (No. 16) after the number of students had grown to 230. The first "terminale" class to take their exams in Copenhagen graduated in 1977. Two years later, when the school celebrated its 25-year anniversary, it changed its name to Lycée Français. By 1984 the number of students had grown to more than 320 and in 1989 it adopted its current name in honour of Henrik, Prince Consort of Denmark.

In 1992,  Lycée Français Prins Henrik moved to the former premises of Schneekloth's School at Frederiksberg Allé 22. By 2004 the number of students exceeded 500 representing 38 nationalities. In 2005 the school was expanded with a building on Værnedamsvej (No. 13) on the other side of the block.

Student body
In 2011 the school had over 700 students from 40 countries. In 2014, the school had 800 students. Students take part in the decision making at the school thanks to the Student Council. Students are elected to seat at the council for a two-year mandate. The former Vice-President of the Student Council was Capucine Ratier, until 2020. This shows that students at this Lycée are pushed to implicate themselves as much as possible in the betterment of society.

List of headmasters
 1969: Mrs. Bergonzat
  1974: Mr. Morel
  1977: Mrs. Coutin
  1984: Mr. Dol
  1987: Mrs. Merchadou
  1991: Mr. Luciani
  1995: Mrs. Sarrat
  1996: Mr. Jérôme
  1997: Mrs. Stephen
  2001: Mr. Voldoire
  2006: Mrs. Pellereau
  2009: Mr. Luyckx
  2011: Mrs. Direnberger
  2014: Mr. Chesne
  2019: Mrs. Vittaz

References

External links

  Lycée Français Prins Henrik
  Lycée Français Prins Henrik
  "VIDEO: Prins Henrik hyldet" (Archive). Billed Bladet. 

Copenhagen
French
Primary schools in Copenhagen
Secondary schools in Copenhagen
Education in Copenhagen
Buildings and structures in Frederiksberg Municipality
Educational institutions established in 1954
1954 establishments in Denmark